Lifeblood or Life blood can refer to:

 Blood, a bodily fluid in animals
Life Blood (film), a supernatural horror thriller film released in 2009
Lifeblood (album), the seventh studio album by the Welsh alternative rock band Manic Street Preachers
Lifesblood, a 2001 EP by Mastodon
Lifeblood (novel), sequel to the novel Darkside, a children's novel by Tom Becker
Life's Blood, an American hardcore punk band
"Life's Blood", a song by the Eighteen Visions from their EP Lifeless and album The Best of Eighteen Visions
Lifeblood (charity), a UK-based charity now known as Thrombosis UK